Arlington Ridge Park, also known as the Nevius Tract, is a historic park property located in  Arlington, Virginia. The property lies within the boundaries of the George Washington Memorial Parkway. It includes the Marine Corps War Memorial (1954), also known as the Iwo Jima Memorial; and the Netherlands Carillon (1960).

It was listed on the National Register of Historic Places in 2009.

References

External links

Parks in Arlington County, Virginia
George Washington Memorial Parkway
Parks on the National Register of Historic Places in Virginia
National Register of Historic Places in Arlington County, Virginia
Buildings and structures completed in 1954